The eighteenth season of South African Idols premiered on 17 July 2022 on the Mzansi Magic television network under the theme "Singing a Different Tune". Over 9,000 contestants auditioned for the season. The season was won by Thapelo Molomo and the runner-up was Nozi Sibiya.

Shortly after online auditions for the season were opened, it was announced that Randall Abrahams and Unathi Nkayi would not return to the show as judges. In February 2022, M-Net announced that Thembi Seete and JR were going to replace them, joining Somizi Mhlongo on the judges panel.

Finalists
This season, instead of the usual Top 16, a Top 12 was announced on 21 August 2022.

Weekly Song Choice and Results

Top 12: Duets with Mzansi Stars & Greatest Hits of Today

Group 1 (28 August)

Group 2 (4 September)

Top 10: Spotify's Soulful Sundays (11 September)

Top 9: History of Music in Mzansi (18 September)

Top 8: Parents' High School Crush (25 September)

Top 7: Showstopper (2 October)

Top 6: Lifesong & Joyous Celebration (9 October)

Top 5: The Babyface Songbook & Local Chart Toppers (16 October)

Top 4: New School Mzansi Hits & How It Should Have Been Done (23 October)

Top 3: My Audition Song, Divas and Divos & Judges' Choice (30 October)

Top 2 (6 November) 

Before her elimination, Mpilwenhle Mokopu performed her single "Ngiyazifela".

Elimination Chart 
Colour key

References 

Season 18
2022 South African television seasons